John Parker (1754 – 25 May 1797) was an English politician who was Member of Parliament (MP) for Clitheroe from  1780 to 1782 and Honorary Bowbearer of the Forest of Bowland, Lancashire.

He was the son of Edward Parker of Browsholme Hall, Yorkshire (now in Lancashire), and was educated at Eton College and Christ's College, Cambridge. His paternal aunt was Elizabeth Parker (later Shackleton) who had managed the family seat in the 1740s. Elizabeth documented her life from 1762 which included references to her brother Edward and his son.

Parker married Beatrix Lister, daughter of Thomas Lister (1723–61) of Gisburn Park, and sister of Thomas Lister who controlled the Clitheroe seat. Parker was elected MP for Clitheroe in 1780. Without having spoken in the House, he made way for John Lee in 1782. 

The patron of the arts and antiquarian Thomas Lister Parker was his son.

References

Notes

1754 births
1797 deaths
Members of the Parliament of Great Britain for English constituencies
British MPs 1780–1784
People educated at Eton College
Alumni of Christ's College, Cambridge
John